Aleksei Igraev (sometimes listed as Oleksiy Ihraiev, born 27 July 1972) is a Ukrainian sprint canoeist who competed in the early to mid-1990s. At the 1992 Summer Olympics in Barcelona, he finished eighth in the C-2 1000 m event for the Unified Team. Four years later in Atlanta, Igraev was eliminated for Ukraine in the semifinals of both the C-2 500 m and the C-2 1000 m events.

References
Sports-Reference.com profile

1972 births
Canoeists at the 1992 Summer Olympics
Canoeists at the 1996 Summer Olympics
Living people
Olympic canoeists of the Unified Team
Olympic canoeists of Ukraine
Ukrainian male canoeists